Samarium(II) fluoride is one of fluorides of samarium with a chemical formula SmF2.

Production 
Samarium(II) fluoride can be produced by using samarium or hydrogen gas to reduce samarium(III) fluoride:

References 

Samarium compounds
Fluorides